West Virginia's 17th Senate district is one of 17 districts in the West Virginia Senate. It is currently represented by Republicans Tom Takubo and Eric Nelson. All districts in the West Virginia Senate elect two members to staggered four-year terms.

Geography
District 17 covers the southern half of Kanawha County, including parts of Charleston and the nearby communities of St. Albans, Tornado, South Charleston, Coal Fork, Pinch, Elkview, Clendenin, Marmet, Belle, Chesapeake, and Cedar Grove.

The district is located entirely within West Virginia's 2nd congressional district, and overlaps with the 32nd, 35th, 36th, 39th, and 40th districts of the West Virginia House of Delegates.

Recent election results

2022

Historical election results

2020

2018

2016

2014

2012

Federal and statewide results in District 17

References

17
Kanawha County, West Virginia